Hastings railway station is located on the Stony Point line in Victoria, Australia. It serves the town of Hastings, and it opened on 10 September 1889.

The station once had a goods yard opposite the platform, however it is now closed and the tracks have been removed, with a disused crane remaining on site.

History

Hastings station opened on 10 September 1889, when the railway line from Baxter was extended. It remained a terminus until 17 December of that year, when the line was extended to Stony Point. Like the town itself, the station was named after Hastings in Sussex, England.

In 1973, a number of roads in the former goods yard were extended.

On 22 June 1981, the passenger service between Frankston and Stony Point was withdrawn and replaced with a bus service, with the line between Long Island Junction and Stony Point also closing on the same day. On 16 September 1984, promotional trips for the reopening of the line began and, on 27 September of that year, the passenger service was reinstated.

In February 1986, the current station building was provided, replacing the original timber building.

In 2004, points at the Up and Down ends of the station were removed, and the track was straight railed.

Platforms and services

Hastings has one platform. It is serviced by Metro Trains' Stony Point line services.

Platform 1:
  all stations services to Frankston; all stations services to Stony Point

Transport links

Ventura Bus Lines operates one route via Hastings station, under contract to Public Transport Victoria:
 : Frankston station – Flinders

Gallery

References

External links
 Melway map at street-directory.com.au

Railway stations in Melbourne
Railway stations in Australia opened in 1889
Railway stations in the Shire of Mornington Peninsula